The Revolutionary Communist League (RCL) or 'Brit Kommunistim Mahapchanit' was a Trotskyist party in Mandatory Palestine in the late 1930s and 1940s.

It was built out of three components: exiled German Jewish members of Heinrich Brandler’s KPO (Communist Party Opposition – which emerged from the Right Opposition within the Comintern) who became supporters of the International Left Opposition; youth in the Hugim Marxistiim (Marxist Circles), the youth section of a wing of Left Poale Zion, which at the time was linked to the 'centrist' London Bureau; and elements coming from the left Zionist kibbutz movement, Hashomer Hatzair, which was also linked to the London Bureau. Later, in the 1940s, they were joined by Jabra Nicola, an Arab Communist who broke with the Palestine Communist Party over the Molotov-Ribbentrop pact.

The Brit Kommunistim Mahapchanin published a newspaper, Kol Hama’amad (Voice of the Class).

Tony Cliff was a member, before moving to Britain and joining the RCL's sister party in the Fourth International, the Revolutionary Communist Party (UK) and later leading the International Socialists.

References

Further reading
S. Dotan 1991. The Reds: the Communist Party in Israel, p. 498
Michel Warschawski Response: The Israeli Communist Party and the Radical Anti-Zionist Left, MERIP Reports, No. 66 (Apr., 1978), pp. 24–25

External links

Texts by the Revolutionary Communist League (Palestine)
"Palestine Strike: Arabs and Jews Unite" by T. Cliff, Socialist Appeal, May 1946, p3.
"On the Irresponsible Handling of the Palestine Question" by Tony Cliff of the RCL(P), December 1946.
"Against Partition", text by the RCL(P), 1947
"Against the Stream", text by the RCL(P), May 1948

Information on the Revolutionary Communist League (Palestine)
"The Fight for Trotskyism in Palestine", The Internationalist, Summer 2001
Tony Cliff's autobiography
International Trotskyist Opposition Theses on Palestine
"Arab-Jewish workers' joint struggles prior to the partition of Palestine" (mentions the Revolutionary Communist League)

Communist parties in Mandatory Palestine
Trotskyist organizations in Asia
Political parties in Mandatory Palestine
Political parties established in the 1930s
1930s establishments in Mandatory Palestine
Political parties disestablished in the 1940s
1940s disestablishments in Mandatory Palestine